Evan Junior Rodriguez (born September 21, 1988) is a former American football tight end. He played college football for Temple. He is of Puerto Rican descent and Moorish American 

Rodriguez grew up in North Bergen, New Jersey and played football at North Bergen High School.

Professional career

2012 NFL Draft

He was drafted in the fourth round, and number 111 overall in the 2012 NFL Draft by the Chicago Bears.

Chicago Bears
On May 8, Rodriguez signed a 4-year contract with the Chicago Bears. In 2012, Rodriguez appeared in 12 games with five starts, catching four passes for 21 yards.

On June 10, 2013, Rodriguez was released.

Miami Dolphins
On June 11, 2013, Rodriguez was signed by the Miami Dolphins. Rodriguez was cut from the Miami Dolphins on September 1, 2013.

Buffalo Bills
The Buffalo Bills signed him on November 4, 2013. On August 29, 2014, they released him in their finals cuts for the 53-man roster.

Tampa Bay Buccaneers
Tampa Bay Buccaneers signed him to their practice squad on November 25, 2014, after Jorvorskie Lane was ruled out for the rest of the season.

San Antonio Commanders
In December 2018, Rodriguez signed with the San Antonio Commanders of the Alliance of American Football (AAF). The league ceased operations in April 2019.

Seattle Dragons
Rodriguez was drafted in the 2020 XFL Draft by the Seattle Dragons of the XFL. He had his contract terminated when the league suspended operations on April 10, 2020.

Personal life
During his time at West Virginia, Rodriguez was charged with felony assault in relation to a physical altercation he had with a female residence hall adviser; the charge was later reduced to misdemeanor disturbance and trespassing. He was later arrested for disorderly conduct at Temple in April 2009. On March 21, 2013, Rodriguez was arrested in Miami Beach, Florida for disorderly intoxication and resisting a police officer without violence. Rodriguez had been in Miami to train with some of his teammates, but after his arrest, faced a $1,500 bail. Later in the year, on May 31, Rodriguez was arrested for driving under the influence, speeding and improper lane switching on Interstate 90 in Illinois.

References

External links
 Chicago Bears bio

1988 births
Living people
American football tight ends
American football fullbacks
Buffalo Bills players
Chicago Bears players
Lehigh Valley Steelhawks players
Miami Dolphins players
North Bergen High School alumni
People from North Bergen, New Jersey
Players of American football from New Jersey
Puerto Rican players of American football
San Antonio Commanders players
Seattle Dragons players
Sportspeople from Hudson County, New Jersey
Temple Owls football players
Tampa Bay Buccaneers players